Elections for Ipswich Borough Council were held on 10 June 2004. One third of the council was up for election and the Labour Party lost overall control of the council to no overall control. A Conservative-Liberal Democrat coalition was formed after the election.

After the election, the composition of the council was:
Labour 23
Conservative 18
Liberal Democrat 7

Election result

Ward results

Alexandra

Bixley

Bridge

Castle Hill

Gainsborough

Gipping

Holywells

Priory Heath

Rushmere (2)

Sprites

St John's

St Margaret's

Stoke Park

Westgate

Whitehouse

Whitton

References
2004 Ipswich election result

2004 English local elections
2004
2000s in Suffolk